National Route 194 is a national highway of Japan connecting Kōchi, Kōchi and Saijō, Ehime, with a total length of 88.3 km (54.87 mi).

History
Route 194 was originally designated on 18 May 1953 from Kōchi to Tokushima. This was redesignated Route 55 on 1 April 1963.

References

National highways in Japan
Roads in Ehime Prefecture
Roads in Kōchi Prefecture